Thiagarajan Sivanandam (born 21 June 1946) is an Indian actor, director and producer in Tamil cinema. Beside Tamil, he has also acted in several Malayalam and Kannada films and a few Telugu films. He is the father of Tamil actor Prashanth and the maternal uncle of Tamil actor Vikram.

Career
Basically a businessman, Thiagarajan made his acting debut with Alaigal Oivathillai, appearing as the elder brother of the film's lead actress Radha.<ref>{{Cite web |date=9 October 2002 |title=Its all about choices |url=http://www.thehindu.com/thehindu/mp/2002/10/09/stories/2002100900150300.htm |archive-url=https://web.archive.org/web/20030312210323/http://thehindu.com/thehindu/mp/2002/10/09/stories/2002100900150300.htm |url-status=dead |work=The Hindu |archive-date=12 March 2003 }}</ref> The film became successful and offers poured in for him. His portrayal of a jungle bandit in Malaiyoor Mambattiyan provided him a major breakthrough in his career. He was part of such successful films as Neengal Kettavai and Paayum Puli.

He acted in the Malayalam film New Delhi, which became successful and his portrayal of a goon received acclaim. The success of the film prompted Thiagarajan to make his directorial debut titled Salem Vishnu, based on the character which he had played in that film. He then directed Aanazhagan, with his son Prashanth in the leading role. Prashanth appeared in a drag role and revealed that the most daunting aspects of the role were the "waxing, the threading, the works" as well as "wearing a sari in summer, doing a bharatanatya sequence in a woman's costume, and getting the nuances and variations right were the other challenges", revealing that his mum had assisted him.

According to Prashanth, the film was an average grosser. Thiagarajan then stayed away from the limelight, paving the way for his son. He later returned to acting, appearing in a small role as a father to his son in Jai.

Thiagarajan then directed Shock, remake of the Hindi film Bhoot in 2004. Apart from directing and producing the film, Thiagarajan handled the art and costumes department and also appeared in the film as police inspector. The film's shoot was completed in twenty-six days, with meticulous pre-planning arranged by Thiagarajan. The film received positive reviews citing that the makers "deserve an appreciation for his honest and sincere attempt on the screen".

In September 2004, Thiagarajan launched Police, a remake of the Hindi film Khakee and the film received coverage from the media after producers had approached Amitabh Bachchan and Aishwarya Rai for key roles. In interviews during the period, Thiagarajan mentioned the grand scale of the project, citing that schedules would also be shot abroad; however the film failed to progress. He then returned to acting with the films Bodyguard, Drohi and Vaaimai.

In early 2007, Thiagarajan approached M. Karunanidhi with the intention of making a film on his adaptation of the Ponnar Shankar epic that he had written in the late 1970s. The latter accepted Thiagarajan's offer and approved of his decision to cast his son Prashanth, in the dual lead role.

The film was released in 2011 to mixed reviews and did average business. The next year, he directed Mambattiyan, a remake of his successful 1983 film in which he had acted. His son played the titular role. The film received mixed reviews by critics, it took a good opening at the box office, but petered out to do average business commercially and due to its big budget, it failed to recover costs.

In 2014, he revealed that he would direct the remakes of Hindi films Special 26 and Queen'' in four south Indian languages.

Filmography

As actor

As director, producer, writer and art director

References

External links

Tamil film directors
Living people
Tamil male actors
Male actors in Malayalam cinema
Indian male film actors
Male actors in Kannada cinema
1945 births
Male actors from Chennai
Male actors in Tamil cinema
21st-century Indian film directors
Film producers from Chennai
Tamil film producers
20th-century Indian male actors
21st-century Indian male actors
20th-century Indian film directors